The 2. Rugby Bundesliga is the second level of domestic club rugby union competition in Austria. Wombats RC of Wiener Neustadt is the only separate club in the league, the rest of the teams being the second teams of the 1. Rugby Bundesliga clubs.

History
The 2. Rugby Bundesliga was first played in the 1995/1996 season.

Current teams
2010-11 season

Results
The scores in blue are links to accounts of finals on the site of the Austrian Rugby Federation (ÖRV) - in German

See also
Rugby union in Austria

References

External links
 Official site

Rugby union in Austria